Camaenidae is a family of air-breathing land snails, terrestrial pulmonate gastropod mollusks in the superfamily Helicoidea, the typical snails and their allies. This is one of the most diverse families in the clade Stylommatophora.

These snails occur in a wide variety of habitats in the tropics of Eastern Asia and Australasia.

A large American group, which is mainly represented by species from the Caribbean, has, until recently, also been subsumed under the Camaenidae. However, latest molecular phylogenetic studies showed that these species represent a different family, the Pleurodontidae.

This molecular study also implies that the Bradybaeninae, previously treated as a distinct family within the Helicoidea, is a junior synonym of the Camaenidae.

Anatomy 
Camaenid shells are often quite large (25–50 mm), but a number of species also have small shells (<5 mm). Shells reveal a remarkable diversity in shape and colour, which is partly linked with their lifestyle. For instance, arboreal species tend to have large and conical shells, whereas terrestrial species often have rather flat shells. The shells of some taxa can be vividly coloured, showing banding or other conspicuous patterns, but others are plain and uniform.

This family is defined by a missing diverticulum and a missing stimulatory organ. It is suggested that the family Camaenidae as currently delimited is a polyphyletic taxon. There are no synapomorphies uniting this diverse family. The American group is closely related to the families Helicidae and Helminthoglyptidae, while the Australasian group is a closely related to the Bradybaenidae.

In order to retain the Camaenidae as a monophyletic clade, the Neotropical Pleurodontidae will need to be removed as an independent family and the Bradybaenidae will need to be included. This taxonomic decision is currently pending a formal suggestion and wider acceptance among systematists, however.

In this family, the number of haploid chromosomes lies between 26 and 30 (according to the values in this table).

Subfamilies 
Division into subfamilies has been suggested, however, given the unresolved relationships on the family level, the subfamilial treatments must be considered hypothetical. They do not reflect the results of comprehensive phylogenetic analyses and are not corroborated by current molecular data.

The following three subfamilies have been recognized in the taxonomy of Bouchet & Rocroi (2005) (as based on a suggestion of Alan Solem)
subfamily Camaeninae Pilbry, 1895 – synonyms: Amphidrominae Kobelt, 1902; Hadridae Iredale, 1937; Xanthomelontidae Iredale, 1937; Chloritidae Iredale, 1938; Papuinidae Iredale, 1938; Calyciidae Iredale, 1941; Planispiridae Iredale, 1941; Cristovalinae Schileyko, 2003
subfamily Rhagadinae Iredale, 1938
subfamily Sinumeloninae Solem, 1992

A different taxonomy of the Caemenidae was used by Schileyko (1998–2003).

The new taxonomy of the gastropods, published in 2017 and accepted by WoRMS, gives the following subfamilies:
 Camaeninae Pilsbry, 1895 [= Amphidrominae Kobelt, 1902]
 Bradybaeninae Pilsbry, 1934 (1898)
 tribe Bradybaenini Pilsbry, 1934 (1898) [= Eulotidae Möllendorff, 1898; = Fruticicolinae Kobelt, 1904; = Buliminopsinae Hoffmann, 1928]
 tribe Aegistini Kuroda & Habe, 1949
 tribe Euhadrini Habe, Okutani & Nishiwaki, 1994 
 Hadrinae Iredale, 1937 [= Xanthomelontidae Iredale, 1937; = Rhagadidae Iredale, 1938; = Chloritidae Iredale, 1938; = Papuinidae Iredale, 1938; = Calyciidae Iredale, 1941; = Planispiridae Iredale, 1941; = Sinumeloninae Solem, 1992; = Cristovalinae Schileyko, 2003]
 Helicostylinae Ihering, 1909378 [= Pfeifferiinae Gray, 1855; = Cochlostylidae Möllendorff, 1890]
As of March 2023, WoRMS accepts four subfamilies:

 Bradybaeninae Pilsbry, 1895
 Camaeninae Iredale, 1937
 Hadrinae Iredale, 1937
 Helicostylinae Ihering, 1909 (1890)

Genera 
Currently, the following genera are accepted within the family Camaenidae:

Taxa with main occurrence in South-East Asia 
 Camaena Albers, 1850 – type genus of the family Camaenidae
 Amphicoelina Haas, 1933
 Amphidromus Albers, 1850
 Bouchetcamaena Thach, 2018 (debated synonym of Trichochloritis Pilsbry, 1891)
 Chloritis Beck, 1837
 Entadella Páll-Gergely & Hunyadi, 2016
 Ganesella  W. T. Blanford, 1863
 Globotrochus F. Haas, 1935
 Karaftohelix Pilsbry, 1927
 Moellendorffia
 Neocepolis Pilsbry, 1891
 Obba
 Parachloritis Ehrmann, 1912
 Pfeifferia Gray, 1853
 Philbouchetia Thach, 2020
 Plectotropis E. von Martens, 1860
 Pseudobuliminus Gredler, 1886
 Pseudopartula L. Pfeiffer, 1856
 Satsuma
 Sinorachis M. Wu & Z.-Y. Chen, 2019
 Stegodera
 Trachia
 Trachystyla
 Trichochloritis Pilsbry, 1891

Taxa with main occurrence in Papua New Guinea to Solomon Islands
 Albersia
 Calycia H. Adams, 1865
 Canefriula
 Chloraea Albers, 1850
 Cryptaegis
 Crystallopsis
 Forcartia
 Mecyntera
 Megalacron I. Rensch, 1934
 Meliobba
 Papuanella
 Papuexul Iredale, 1933
 Papuina Martens, 1860
 Papustyla
 Planispira Beck, 1837
 Quirosena Iredale, 1941
 Rhynchotrochus Möllendorff, 1895
 Rhytidoconcha
 Smeatonia

Australian genera In Australia, the Camaenidae comprise 131 currently recognized genera, most of which are endemic to the continent.
 

 Adclarkia Stanisic, 1996
 Aetholitis Stanisic, 2010
 Amplirhagada Iredale, 1933
 Arnemelassa Iredale, 1938
 Aslintesta Solem, 1992
 Australocosmica Köhler, 2011
 Austrocomaena Stanisic, 2010
 Austrochloritis Pilsbry, 1890
 Basedowena Iredale, 1937
 Baudinella Thiele, 1931
 Bentosites Iredale, 1933
 Billordia Stanisic, 2010
 Boriogenia Stanisic, 2010
 Calvigenia Iredale, 1938
 Caperantrum Solem, 1992

 Carinotrachia Solem, 1985
 Chloritisanax Iredale, 1933
 Contramelon Iredale, 1937
 Cooperconcha Solem, 1997
 Crikey Stanisic, 2009 – with one species Crikey steveirwini Stanisic, 2009
 Cristigibba Tapparone-Canefri, 1883
 Cristilabrum Solem, 1981
 Crookshanksia Stanisic, 2010
 Cupedora Iredale, 1933
 Damochlora Iredale, 1938
 Dirutrachia Iredale, 1937
 Discomelon Iredale, 1938
 Divellomelon Iredale, 1933
 Eurytrachia Stanisic, 2010
 Exiligada Iredale, 1939
 Eximiorhagada Iredale, 1938
 Falspleuroxia Solem, 1997
 Figuladra Iredale, 1938
 Forrestena Stanisic, 2010
 Galadistes Iredale, 1938
 Gloreugenia Iredale, 1933
 Globorhagada Iredale, 1933
 Glyptorhagada Pilsbry, 1890
 Gnarosophia Iredale, 1933
 Granulomelon Iredale, 1933
 Hadra Albers, 1860
 Jacksonena Iredale, 1937
 Jimbouria Stanisic, 2010
 Kandochloritis Shea & Griffiths, 2010
 Kendrickia Solem, 1985
 Kimberleydiscus Köhler, 2010 – with one species Kimberleydiscus fasciatus Köhler, 2010
 Kimberleymelon Köhler, 2010 – with one species Kimberleymelon tealei Köhler, 2010
 Kimberleytrachia Köhler, 2011
 Kimboraga Iredale, 1939
 Lacustrelix Iredale, 1933
 Lamprellia Stanisic, 2010
 Lynfergusonia Stanisic, 2010
 Marylnessa Stanisic, 2010
 Meliobba Iredale, 1940
 Melostrachia Solem, 1979
 Meridistis Stanisic, 2010
 Meridolum Iredale, 1942
 Mesodontrachia Solem, 1985
 Micromelon Solem, 1992
 Minimelon Solem, 1993
 Molema Köhler, 2011
 Montanomelon Solem, 1993
 Monteithosites Stanisic, 1996
 Moretonistes Stanisic, 2010
 Mouldingia Solem, 1984
 MussonenaIredale, 1938
 Nannochloritis Iredale, 1938
 Neveritis Iredale, 1938
 Ningbingia Solem, 1981
 Noctepuna Iredale, 1933
 Obstengenia Iredale, 1933
 Offachloritis Iredale, 1933
 Ordtrachia Solem, 1984
 Pallidelix Iredale, 1933
 Papuexul Iredale, 1933
 Parglogenia Iredale, 1938
 Patrubella Iredale, 1938
 Perioinsolita Stanisic & Potter, 2010
 Petraconcha Clark, 2009
 Plectorhagada Iredale, 1933
 Pleuroxia Ancey, 1887
 Pommerhelix Clark, 2009
 Ponderconcha Clark, 2009
 Posorites Iredale, 1933
 Promonturconchum Solem, 1997
 Protolinitis Stanisic, 2010
 Prototrachia Solem, 1984
 Prymnbriareus Solem, 1981
 Pseudcupedora Solem, 1992
 Quistrachia Iredale, 1939
 Ramogenia Iredale, 1938
 Rhagada Albers, 1860 – type genus of the subfamily Rhagadinae
 Retroterra Solem, 1985
 Sauroconcha Zhang & Shea, 2008
 Semotrachia Iredale, 1933
 Setobaudinia Iredale, 1933
 Sinumelon Iredale, 1930 – type genus of the subfamily Sinumeloninae
 Sphaerospira Mörch, 1867
 Spurlingia Iredale, 1933
 Squamagenia Stanisic & Potter, 2010
 Stanisicia Clark, 2009
 Strepsitaurus Solem, 1997
 Tatemelon Solem, 1993
 Temporena Iredale, 1933
 Thersites Pfeiffer, 1855
 Tolgachloritis Iredale, 1933
 Toombatrachia Stanisic, 2010
 Torresitrachia Iredale, 1939
 Trachiopsis Pilsbry, 1893
 Trozena Iredale, 1938
 Turgenitubulus Solem, 1981
 Varohadra Iredale, 1933
 Ventopelita Iredale, 1943
 Vidumelon Iredale, 1933
 Westraltrachia Iredale, 1933
 Xanthomelon Martens, 1860
 Youwanjela Köhler & Shea, 2012

References

Further reading 
 Köhler F. (2009) "Phylogeny and evolution of the Camaenidae in north-western Australia: A model case for the study of speciation and radiation". In: McDoughall C. & Hall N. (Eds.) Molluscs 2009: Program and abstracts. Malacological Society of Australasia, Brisbane, p. 55.
 Wade C. M., Hudelot C., Davison A. Naggs, F. & Mordan P. B. (2007). "Molecular phylogeny of the helicoid land snails (Pulmonata: Stylommatophora: Helicoidea), with special emphasis on the Camaenidae". Journal of Molluscan Studies 73(4): 411–415. .

External links

  Australian Camaenidae

 
Helicoidea
Gastropod genera